Parma Associazione Calcio once again troubled the top teams in both Italy and Europe, but had to settle for just the curtain-raising UEFA Super Cup as silverware in its ambitious ascent towards the top of Italian football. It almost repeated the victory in the 1992–93 UEFA Cup Winners' Cup by reaching another final, but lost out to Arsenal.

The purchase of Gianfranco Zola from Napoli was successful, given his second place in the topscoring charts, beaten only by Giuseppe Signori of Lazio. Together with Tomas Brolin and Faustino Asprilla, Parma's attack left many teams without a chance, but the defence was not good enough to match the level of champions Milan, who conceded less than half of the 35 goals Parma did.

Players

Goalkeepers
  Luca Bucci
  Marco Ballotta

Defenders
  Antonio Benarrivo
  Luigi Apolloni
  Lorenzo Minotti
  Alberto Di Chiara
  Roberto Sensini
  Georges Grün
  David Balleri
  Salvatore Matrecano
  Roberto Maltagliati
  Gianluca Falsini

Midfielders
  Massimo Crippa
  Gabriele Pin
  Fausto Pizzi
  Tomas Brolin
  Daniele Zoratto
  Roberto Colacone

Forwards
  Faustino Asprilla
  Gianfranco Zola
  Giovanni Sorce
  Alessandro Melli

Competitions

Serie A

League table

Matches

Coppa Italia

Quarterfinals

Semifinals

European Cup Winners' Cup

First round

Second round

Quarter-finals

Semi-finals

Final

European Super Cup

Statistics

Goalscorers
  Gianfranco Zola 18
  Faustino Asprilla 10
  Tomas Brolin 5
  Alessandro Melli 4

References

Parma Calcio 1913 seasons
Parma